Conotremopsis is a genus of fungi within the family Stictidaceae. This is a monotypic genus, containing only the single species Conotremopsis weberiana.

References

Ostropales
Lichen genera
Ostropales genera
Taxa described in 1977
Taxa named by Antonín Vězda